The gens Terentilia was an obscure plebeian family at ancient Rome.  Only one member of this gens appears in history; Gaius Terentilius Arsa was tribune of the plebs in 462 BC.  A few others are known from inscriptions.

Origin
The nomen Terentilius belongs to a large class of gentilicia derived from other names, typically cognomina ending in diminutive suffixes such as -ulus and -illus.  Here the name may be formed from another nomen, Terentius, for which the diminutive Terentillus is found.  The antiquarian Varro, himself a member of the Terentia gens, derived this name from terenus, a Sabine word meaning "soft", although Chase proposes the Latin terens, one who grinds or threshes.  One of the Terentilii known from inscriptions has an Oscan praenomen, Statius.

Branches and cognomina
The only surname associated with the early Terentilii is Arsa, also written Harsa.  The later Terentilii have common cognomina, such as Firmus, strong, and Rufus, red.

Members

 Gaius Terentilius Arsa, tribune of the plebs in 462 BC, called for the establishment of a commission to codify the laws respecting the imperium of the consuls.
 Gaius Terentilius, a freedman named in an inscription from Praeneste in Latium.
 Publius Terentilius, built a tomb at Tarquinii in Etruria.
 Quintus Terentilius, the father of Quintus Terentilius Rufus.
 Statius Terentilius, the former master of Statius Terentilius Firmus.
 Titus Terentilius, the former master of Gaius Terentilius.
 Statius Terentilius St. l. Firmus, a freedman named in an inscription from Rome.
 Quintus Terentilius Q. f. Rufus, named in an inscription from Rome.

See also
 List of Roman gentes

Footnotes

References

Bibliography

 Titus Livius (Livy), History of Rome.
 Dionysius of Halicarnassus, Romaike Archaiologia.
 Ambrosius Theodosius Macrobius, Saturnalia.
 Dictionary of Greek and Roman Biography and Mythology, William Smith, ed., Little, Brown and Company, Boston (1849).
 Theodor Mommsen et alii, Corpus Inscriptionum Latinarum (The Body of Latin Inscriptions, abbreviated CIL), Berlin-Brandenburgische Akademie der Wissenschaften (1853–present).
 George Davis Chase, "The Origin of Roman Praenomina", in Harvard Studies in Classical Philology, vol. VIII, pp. 103–184 (1897).
 T. Robert S. Broughton, The Magistrates of the Roman Republic, American Philological Association (1952).
 Mario Torelli, Elogia Tarquiniensia, Sansoni, Florence (1975).
 John C. Traupman, The New College Latin & English Dictionary, Bantam Books, New York (1995).

Roman gentes